Koha Kokiri (born 7 June 1976) is a New Zealand-born Australian professional darts player.

Career
Kokiri won the men's singles at the 2010 WDF Asia-Pacific Cup in Tokyo, seeing off Morihiro Hashimoto 4–1 in the final.

Kokiri defeated Warren Parry in the final of the 2015 Oceanic Masters to qualify for the 2016 PDC World Darts Championship. He played former world champion Steve Beaton in the first round, losing 3–0. Kokiri won the 2016 West Coast Classic by beating Adam Rowe and lost 6–3 in the final of the Perth Open to David Platt. He played in the Perth Darts Masters, but was knocked out 6–1 by Dave Chisnall in the opening round. Who played in the 2017 Melbourne Darts Masters but knocked out 6–3 by James Wade and the 2017 Perth Darts Masters but was knocked out stages by 6–0 by Daryl Gurney.

World Championship record

PDC
2016: First round (lost to Steve Beaton 0–3)

References

External links

1976 births
Living people
Sportspeople from Porirua
New Zealand darts players
New Zealand expatriate sportspeople in Australia
Professional Darts Corporation associate players
New Zealand Māori sportspeople